Guinee Air Service was an airline based in Conakry, Guinea. It was established and started operations in 1985 and operated domestic charter flights. Its main base was Conakry International Airport.

Fleet
As of March 2007 the Guinee Air Service fleet included:

2 Antonov An-26

References

Airlines established in 1985
1985 establishments in Guinea
Conakry